Stellah Wairimu Bosire, is a Kenyan physician, corporate executive, human rights activist and author, a former  co-executive director of Uhai Eashri and previously served as the chief executive officer of Kenya Medical Association and as the vice-chair of the HIV and AIDS Tribunal of Kenya.

Background and education
She was born and grew up in Kibera, the largest slum in Nairobi, Kenya's capital and largest city. Stellah was a student at Kibera Primary school but sat for Kenya's Certificate of Primary Education at Joseph Kang'ethe Primary School. She had a challenging childhood having spent a better part of her life as a homeless street child exposing her to various violations including sexual violence to which she is a survivor. She became addicted to drugs and alcohol, while still a teenager. Stellah's mother had schizophrenia and therefore required very close help from her children. Her mother died from HIV/AIDs related complications in 2011.

She was fortunate to become enrolled in "State House Girls High School", in Nairobi for her O-Level education, graduating in 2003. Following the completion of her A-Level schooling, she was admitted to the University of Nairobi to study human medicine, graduating in 2012 with a Bachelor of Medicine and Bachelor of Surgery degree. Later she obtained a Master of Science degree in Global Health Policy, from the University of London International Programmes, in 2017. She also holds a Master of Business Administration degree program at Strathmore Business School, and as of 2017, was enrolled for a Bachelor of Laws, degree at the University of Nairobi. She also holds a Diploma in Reproductive Health, obtained from the Geneva Foundation for Medical Education and Research, in 2016.

Work experience
Dr. Stellah Bosire is a health professional with extensive international and domestic experience with and foreign government agencies, private donors, and other organizations monitoring and appraising public health programs, conducting epidemiological and operations research; measuring the impact of novel techniques for disease prevention, treatment, and mitigation; and document program outputs, effectiveness, and strategic development.

She has a strong experience in non-profit fundraising and management; Outstanding experience in effectively leading change and organizational growth through strategic planning; exceptional knowledge of staff leadership, fundraising, partnership development, and financial management; Sound knowledge of issues that are faced by vulnerable communities; Skilled in leading and assisting staff teams; Ability to create and implement an effective fundraising program; Ability to provide case support, connect donors and encourage giving.

As a gender specialist, she is an expert in organizational development and results-based management She has worked with, multilateral governments, public and private philanthropies, INGOs, CBOs, and governments to build capacity in gender equality and women's rights as well as other marginalized communities. She performs gender analysis, analyzing from grassroots levels (the micro-level), intermediate levels (Meso level), the highest political levels (macro-level), and across all sectors and programs of development collaborations. She has also been involved in conducting policy briefs, research, project review, and evaluation studies, and baseline surveys in the following areas; Sexual and reproductive health and rights (SRHR); HIV; TB; Human Rights; Key Population; Public Health; Training and Gender being a crosscutting theme.

Previously, following the completion of her internship, she worked for the Government of Kenya for a year before she moved to the private sector. She was employed by Avenue Healthcare, a network of Urgent Care Centers, as the Physician Manager taking up leadership of various branches. Since September 2013, Dr. Bosire-Otieno has served as the vice-chairperson of the HIV/AIDS Tribunal of Kenya. In this capacity, she focuses on advancing human rights and access to justice for persons affected and infected by HIV/AIDSIn 2016, she left Avenue Healthcare to be involved in Public Healthcare policy in Kenya by taking up the role of the chief executive officer of Kenya Medical Association. Effective October 2016, she was appointed as the chief executive officer and Secretary to the Board of Kenya Medical Association, industry advocacy and advisory group.

Bosire was until July 2022 one of the Co-Executive Directors of UHAI EASHRI

Articles written
1. Hospital Debt, Detention and Dignity in Health,
 
2. TB and Gender Assessment;  

3. Vaccinate girls to save them from cervical cancer;  

4. Lessons for Kenya from US actions on Geneva Consensus Declaration; 

5. The skeletons in the medical field; 
 
6. We are partly to blame on school unrest;  

7. Participatory grant-making, can we afford not to do it?  

8. Anti-homosexual laws prevents us from achieving Universal Health Coverage; 

9. Challenging the cookie-cutter solutions to philanthropy; 

10. What Justice Kavanaugh means for Kenya:  

11. LGBTIQ+ health is about way more than sex; 
 
12. How sex pests get away with murder; 

13. Ezekiel’s Mutua’s woes were painfully predictable; 

14. Equality for African Women:  

15. Taking the lead on human rights; 

16. Powerful activists at the frontline of gender equality; 

17. Racial diversity in Global Health;

Other considerations

In 2017 she was named among the "Top 40 Women Under 40 in Kenya", by the Business Daily Africa, an English language daily business newspaper.

In 2019, she was named as the recipient of the Accountability International Leadership Award. The Award, given annually by Accountability International, "is intended to be presented to persons or organizations who play an exceptional role in promoting accountability in the international response to human rights and inclusive sustainable development". That same year, she was awarded by the Queen of England with the Commonwealth Point of Light Award 2019.

References

External links
Website of Kenya Medical Association
Announcements UHAI EASHRI

1986 births
Living people
Kenyan healthcare managers
Kenyan women physicians
University of Nairobi alumni
Alumni of the University of London
Strathmore University alumni
21st-century Kenyan businesswomen
21st-century Kenyan businesspeople
Kenyan chief executives
People from Nairobi